Łukasz Juszkiewicz (born 9 March 1983 in Sulechów) is a Polish footballer (midfielder).

Career

Club
In February 2010, he moved to Wisła Płock on a one-year contract.

In July 2010, he joined Zawisza Bydgoszcz.

References

External links
 

1983 births
Living people
People from Sulechów
Polish footballers
Widzew Łódź players
Górnik Zabrze players
Wisła Płock players
Zawisza Bydgoszcz players
Sportspeople from Lubusz Voivodeship
Association football midfielders